The women's 200 metre individual medley event at the 2010 Asian Games took place on 18 November 2010 at Guangzhou Aoti Aquatics Centre.

There were 14 competitors from 10 countries who took part in this event. Two heats were held, the heat in which a swimmer competed did not formally matter for advancement, as the swimmers with the top eight times from the both field qualified for the finals.

Ye Shiwen and Wang Qun from China won the gold and silver medal, respectively, South Korean swimmer Choi Hye-ra finished with third place.

Schedule
All times are China Standard Time (UTC+08:00)

Records

Results

Heats

Final

References

 16th Asian Games Results

External links 
 Women's 200m Individual Medley Heats Official Website
 Women's 200m Individual Medley Ev.No.34 Final Official Website

Swimming at the 2010 Asian Games